Enclosed Alphanumerics is a Unicode block of typographical symbols of an alphanumeric within a circle, a bracket or other not-closed enclosure, or ending in a full stop.

It is currently fully allocated. Within the Basic Multilingual Plane, a few additional enclosed numerals are in the Dingbats and the Enclosed CJK Letters and Months blocks. There is also a block with more of these characters in the Supplementary Multilingual Plane named Enclosed Alphanumeric Supplement (U+1F100–U+1F1FF), as of Unicode 6.0.

Purpose
Many of these characters were originally intended for use as bullets for lists. The parenthesized forms are historically based on typewriter approximations of the circled versions. Although these roles have been supplanted by styles and other markup in "rich text" contexts, the characters are included in the Unicode standard "for interoperability with the legacy East Asian character sets and for the occasional text context where such symbols otherwise occur." The Unicode Standard considers these characters to be distinct from characters which are similar in form but specialized in purpose, such as the circled C, P or R characters which are defined as copyright and trademark symbols or the circled a used for an at sign.

A circled s (Ⓢ) was used in documents circa 1900 printed by German missionaries, especially the Basel Mission, in the Malayalam language to denote a ditto mark.

Block

Emoji

The Enclosed Alphanumerics block contains one emoji:
U+24C2, the enclosed M used as a symbol for mask works.

It defaults to a text presentation and has two standardized variants defined to specify text presentation (U+FE0E VS15) or emoji-style (U+FE0F VS16).

History
The following Unicode-related documents record the purpose and process of defining specific characters in the Enclosed Alphanumerics block:

See also
 Special characters:
 Enclosed C
 Enclosed A
 Copyright symbol
 Character sets:
 Japanese rebus monogram
 Enclosed Alphanumeric Supplement
 Enclosed CJK Letters and Months (extends enclosed Arabic decimal numbers to ㊿)

References

Typographical symbols
Alphanumerics